The CERH European Women's Roller Hockey Junior Championship is a competition between the female junior national teams in Europe. It takes place every two years and it is organized by CERH. The first two editions are not considered official. Until 2009 the teams were all composed by under-19 players, but since 2010 it has been disputed by U-20 players.

The edition that should have been disputed in 2012 was cancelled due to lack of minimum participating teams.

Winners

Ladies Championship

* Non official editions

Medal table

See also
 U17 Female Tournament

References

External links
 First Euro U-20
 Rink-Hockey.net

European Women's Roller Hockey Junior Championship
Women's roller hockey